The M46 Patton is an American medium tank designed to replace the M26 Pershing and M4 Sherman. It was one of the U.S Army's principal medium tanks of the early Cold War, with models in service from 1949 until the mid-1950s. It was not widely used by U.S. Cold War allies, being exported only to Belgium, and only in small numbers to train crews on the upcoming M47 Patton.

The M46 was the first tank to be named after General George S. Patton Jr., commander of the U.S. Third Army during World War II and one of the earliest American advocates for the use of tanks in battle.

History
After World War II, most U.S. Army armored units were equipped with a mix of M4 Sherman and M26 Pershing tanks. Designed initially as a heavy tank, the M26 Pershing tank was reclassified as a medium tank after the war. The M26 was a significant improvement over the M4 Sherman in firepower and protection. Its mobility, however, was deemed unsatisfactory for a medium tank, as it used the same engine as the much lighter M4A3 and was plagued with an unreliable transmission.

Work began in January 1948 on replacing the original power plant with the Continental AV1790-3 engine and Allison CD-850-1 cross-drive transmission. This design was initially called the M26E2, but modifications continued to accumulate; eventually, the Bureau of Ordnance decided that the tank needed its own unique designation, the M46. The upgraded M26 received a new power plant and a main gun with a bore evacuator.

Upon completion of the first model of the Detroit Tank Arsenal production line in November 1948, the M46 was christened after the late General George S. Patton Jr. By December the Army had ordered several hundred. In July 1950 Detroit Arsenal was producing Pershings and M46s at a rate of over a dozen a day. In August 1950 President Harry S. Truman authorized funding for increased M46 production as part an expansion of heavy tank development program.

A total of 1,160 M46s of all variants were built.

Combat service
The only American combat use of the M46 Patton was during the Korean War. On 8 August 1950, the first M46 Patton tanks, belonging to the 6th Tank Battalion, landed in South Korea. The M46 proved to be capable against North Korean T-34 medium tanks. By the end of 1950, 200 M46 Pattons had been fielded, forming about 15% of US tank strength in Korea; the balance of 1,326 tanks shipped to Korea during 1950 were 679 M4A3 Shermans (including the M4A3E8 variant), 309 M26 Pershings, and 138 M24 Chaffee light tanks. Subsequent shipments of M46 and M46A1 Pattons allowed all remaining M26 Pershings to be withdrawn during 1951, and most Sherman equipped units were also reequipped.

M46 series operators include: 1st Tank Battalion and regimental Antitank Platoons of the 1st Marine Division by 1952, 72nd Armor Regiment of the 2nd Infantry Division by January 1952, 64th Tank Battalion of the 3rd Infantry Division, 73rd Tank Battalion of the 7th Infantry Division by January 1951, 6th Tank Battalion of the 24th Infantry Division, 140th Tank Battalion (took over the tanks of the 6th Tank Battalion) and regimental tank companies of the 40th Infantry Division by October 1951, and the 245th Tank Battalion of the 45th Infantry Division by 1952. Several other regimental tank companies gained M46/M46A1s by the end of the war, including the 7th and 65th Infantry Regiments of the 3rd Infantry Division.

A surviving example of the M46 Patton tank can be seen on display at the War Memorial of Korea in Seoul.

In the 1950s, small numbers of M46s were leased for training purposes at no cost to some European countries, including Belgium, France and Italy, in preparation for the introduction of the M47. American instruction teams used the vehicles to train European tank crews and maintenance personnel.

Variants

 M46 (Dozer) – Variant equipped with M3 dozer conversion kit.
 M46A1 – Product improved variant with improved braking, cooling and fire suppression systems, as well as improved electrical equipment, AV-1790-5B engine and CD-850-4 transmission.
 M46E1 – Pilot model, M46 hull with T42 turret, fitted with the M36 90 mm Gun, and was longer to incorporate a radio, ventilator, and featured a stereoscopic rangefinder; only one built. Prototype of the M47 Patton.

Operators

Former operators

: An unspecified number of M46s were transferred from withdrawing U.S. troops after the Korean War.

Gallery

See also

 List of armored fighting vehicles

Tanks of comparable role, performance and era
 Centurion Mk. 1 British main battle tank
 T-54 Soviet main battle tank

References

Notes

Bibliography

External links

Patton-Mania

Cold War tanks of the United States
Medium tanks of the Cold War
Military vehicles introduced from 1945 to 1949
Medium tanks of the United States